Birds of East Asia is a 2009 book by naturalist Mark Brazil. It lists 985 species of birds resident to East Asia.

References

 
2009 non-fiction books
Bird field guides